Justin Andrew Channing (born 19 November 1968) is an English former footballer who played as a defender or midfielder in the Football League for Queens Park Rangers, Bristol Rovers and Leyton Orient.

Channing signed professional forms with QPR in August 1986 and made his debut in November that year against Luton Town. He played 55 league games for QPR scoring 5 goals before transferring to Bristol Rovers in 1993 for a fee of £275,000, and later spent two seasons at Leyton Orient before moving into non-league football with Slough Town.

References

External links
 

Living people
1968 births
Sportspeople from Reading, Berkshire
Association football defenders
Association football midfielders
English footballers
Queens Park Rangers F.C. players
Bristol Rovers F.C. players
Leyton Orient F.C. players
Slough Town F.C. players
English Football League players
Premier League players
Footballers from Berkshire